The Rio Roosevelt Ecological Station is an ecological station in the state of Mato Grosso, Brazil.

Location

It is in the municipality of Colniza in the state of Mato Grosso.
It is bordered by the Tucumã State Park to the west, by the Roosevelt River to the east, and by the border between the states of Mato Grosso and Amazonas to the north.
It adjoins the  Manicoré State Forest in Amazonas, a sustainable use conservation unit created in 2005.
The MT-206 road runs through the southern part of the ESEC.
The ESEC is home to 30 people from one family, living in three communities.
There are two archaeological sites in the unit.

The Rio Roosevelt Ecological Station is a unit of the Southern Amazon Mosaic of conservation units.
The ESEC would be in the proposed South Amazon Ecotones Ecological Corridor.
It is the responsibility of the Conservation Units Coordinator (CUCO) of the Mato Grosso Secretariat of State for the Environment.
The ESEC is supported by the Amazon Region Protected Areas Program.

History

A series of executive decrees and state laws have defined and redefined the area of the Rio Roosevelt Ecological Station.

The expansion was to compensate for settlements in the "4 Reservas" area of the municipalities of Terra Nova do Norte and Nova Guarita.
The extractive reserve was later occupied by illegal squatters, and was revoked by a judicial order in 2013, confirmed by the state legislature in January 2015.
The judge stated that the lack of environmental protection in the extractive reserve was causing it to be devastated, and it could not be considered compensation for the loss of the "4 Reservas".

Environment

The Rio Roosevelt Ecological Station  is in the Amazon biome.
The ecological station is in one of the most pristine areas of Amazon rainforest in Mato Grosso, away from the zone of agricultural expansion, with sparse population and little deforestation.
The land in the south of the unit has low fertility and contains large areas of flooded land, helping to protect the unit.
The terrain contains plateaus with steep edges, hills, valleys and plains.
Vegetation is mainly rainforest with tall trees of varying density in the wetter areas. 
Higher up the vegetation is mainly cerrado.

The main problem in the reserve is predatory fishing, which is estimated to take at least three tons of fish annually.
The main threats in the region are logging and illegal mining.

Notes

Sources

 

1997 establishments in Brazil
Ecological stations of Brazil
Protected areas of Mato Grosso
Protected areas established in 1997